Cornelia Lynde Meigs (1884–1973) was an American writer of fiction and biography for children, teacher of English and writing, historian and critic of children's literature. She won the Newbery Medal for her 1933 biography of Louisa May Alcott, entitled Invincible Louisa. She also wrote three Newbery Honor Books.

Life
Cornelia Meigs was born December 6, 1884, to civil engineer Montgomery C. Meigs, Jr. and Grace Lynde Meigs in Rock Island, Illinois, the fifth of six daughters. Her sister Grace Meigs Crowder became a noted physician.The family moved to Keokuk, Iowa when she was one month old. After graduating from Keokuk High School in 1901 she attended Bryn Mawr College, receiving an A.B. degree in 1907.
 
Meigs began writing children's books while an English teacher at St. Katherine's School in Davenport, Iowa. Her first book, The Kingdom of the Winding Road, was published by Macmillan US in 1915. In 1922 she was one runner-up for the inaugural Newbery Medal from the professional librarians, recognizing the previous year's "most distinguished contribution to American literature for children". Members of the American Library Association were asked to nominate a book and The Windy Hill by Meigs was the last of six that received at least two votes subsequently designated runners-up. She was one of the runners-up again in 1929 (Clearing Weather) and 1933 (Swift Rivers). Runner-up works are now called Newbery Honor Books, so latter-day editions are authorized to display a silver seal on the cover.

Meigs won a Little, Brown and Co. prize competition with The Trade Wind. Little, Brown published that book in 1927 and subsequently a few more of her works including the children's biographies of Louisa May Alcott and Jane Addams. Meigs is best known for the Alcott biography, Invincible Louisa: The Story of the Author of "Little Women", which won the Newbery Medal in 1934. It follows Alcott from childhood in Pennsylvania and Boston through writing the classic novel Little Women. Kirkus Reviews called Meigs "one of the best-loved authors of fiction for boys and girls", observed that Little Women is "virtually autobiographical", and recommended that the books be paired.

In 1932, Meigs became a professor of English at Bryn Mawr, where she remained until her retirement in 1950. During World War II she took a year of absence for three years to work for the War Department. After leaving Bryn Mawr, Meigs taught writing at the New School of Social Research in New York City. She was the lead editor and one writer of A Critical History of Children's Literature, published by Macmillan in 1953, which has been called "a landmark in the field of children's literature". It was revised under Meigs' leadership and re-issued in 1969. In her lifetime Meigs wrote over 30 fiction books for children, as well as two plays, two biographies, and several books and articles for adults.

Meigs lived at Sion Hill, Havre de Grace, Maryland; and Brandon, Vermont. She died at Havre de Grace, Maryland, on September 10, 1973. Most of her papers are in the Special Collections Library at Dartmouth College. Others are in the de Grummond Collection at the University of Southern Mississippi in Hattiesburg and at the University of Iowa in Iowa City.

Awards

1915 Drama League prize, The Steadfast Princess
1922 Newbery runner-up, Windy Hill
1928 Newbery runner-up, Clearing Weather
1933 Newbery runner-up, Swift Rivers
1927 Beacon Hill Bookshelf Prize, The Trade Wind
1934 Newbery Medal, Invincible Louisa
1963 Lewis Carroll Shelf Award, Invincible Louisa

Letter

For a glimpse into her life, here are excerpts from a letter sent to an Albert Northrop, presumed husband to her niece Elizabeth (Betty):
January 29, 1950.

Dear Albert,

Your nice birthday letter should have had an answer long before this, but so many things do seem to come between me and writing even the letters that I want so much to write. The birthday was a very portentous one, my sixty-fifth, which means I am no longer eligible for Bryn Mawr after June; they have to keep me until then. By a singular chance they have given me more work to do than ever before, quite regardless of the fact that in six months I shall be considered totally unfit ...

You were so good to speak so kindly of Violent Men and Two Arrows. The former had been in hand for a very long time, quite the largest piece of work I had ever undertaken, but it has been the one that I most enjoyed. I have a real passion for history, which grows as the years go by, and was whetted ever more by my seeing some of it being made first hand while I was doing a very humble job in Washington. I realized that if I did not finish it while I was at Bryn Mawr I never would, so I finally succeeded in getting it finished and out of my hands. The Macmillan Company had it for a long time before they published it, so, since I had promised a child's book as the very next thing, I wrote that last year and they came out rather embarrassingly close together. You were a very good friend to read them both. You always give such nice detailed comments, not like the reviewers, or sometimes even the writer of the blurb on the cover who have visibly not got much farther than Chapter six or so ...

Nina (signed in her hand)

Selected works

Children's fiction
 The Kingdom of the Winding Road, The Macmillan Company, 1915
 Master Simon's Garden, Macmillan, 1916
 The Pool of Stars, Macmillan, 1919
 The Windy Hill, Macmillan, 1921
 The Trade Wind, Little, Brown & Co., 1927
The Wonderful Locomotive, Macmillan, 1928
 Clearing Weather, Little Brown, 1928
 The Crooked Apple Tree, Little Brown, 1929
 Swift Rivers, Macmillan, 1934
The Covered Bridge, Macmillan, 1936
 Young Americans, Ginn & Co., 1936
 The Scarlet Oak, Macmillan, 1938
Call of the Mountain, Little Brown, 1940
The Two Arrows, Macmillan, 1949
 The Dutch Colt, Macmillan, 1952
 Wild Geese Flying, Macmillan, 1957
 Mystery at the Red House, Macmillan, 1961
 Willow Whistle
 As the Crow Flies
 The Mounted Messenger
 The New Moon
 Rain on the Roof
 The Vanished Island
 Wind in the Chimney
 Fair Wind to Virginia

Fiction as Adair Aldon
 The Island of Appledore, Macmillan, 1917
 The Pirate of Jasper Peak, Macmillan, 1918
 At the Sign of the Two Heroes, The Century Company, 1920
 The Hill of Adventure, Century, 1922

Plays
The Steadfast Princess, Macmillan, 1916
Helga and the White Peacock, Macmillan, 1922

Biographies
 Invincible Louisa: The Story of the Author of "Little Women", Little Brown, 1933
 Jane Adams: Pioneer for Social Justice: A Biography, Little Brown, 1970

For adults
Railroad West, Little Brown, 1937, (novel)
The Violent Men: A Study of Human Relations in the First American Congress, Macmillan, 1949
A Critical History of Children's Literature: A Survey of Children's Books in English from Earliest Times to the Present, Prepared in Four Parts Under the Editorship of Cornelia Meigs, Macmillan, 1953 (624pp); Cornelia Meigs with Anne Thaxter Eaton, Elizabeth Nesbitt and Ruth Hill Viguers
 Second edition, A Critical History of Children's Literature: A Survey of Children's Books in English, Macmillan, 1969 (708pp)
What Makes a College? A History of Bryn Mawr, Macmillan, 1956

References

External links

 
 
 
 
 Biographical Note at the University of Iowa Libraries
 Cornelia Lynde Meigs, Meigs Family History and Genealogy #1247
 Meigs Family papers at Hagley Museum and Library
  — Meigs using pseudonym
 Cornelia Meigs at Library of Congress Authorities — with 52 catalog records
 The Papers of Cornelia Meigs at Dartmouth College Library

 

1884 births
1973 deaths
American academics of English literature
American children's writers
American women academics
Bryn Mawr College alumni
Bryn Mawr College faculty
Children's literature criticism
Newbery Honor winners
Newbery Medal winners
People from Havre de Grace, Maryland
People from Rock Island, Illinois
Journalists from Illinois